The Phantom is a British sailing dinghy that was designed by Paul Wright and Brian Taylor as a one-design racer and first built in 1971.

Production
The design was at one time built by Butler Boats and Vander Craft, both located in the United Kingdom. It is now constructed by Ovington Boats, which is also in the United Kingdom. Ovington-built boats are still sold by Vander Craft.

The boat can also be amateur-built from plans, using the stitch and glue construction method.

Design
The Phantom is a recreational sailboat, with the hull built predominantly of a fibreglass foam sandwich laminate. The hull has hard chines and a deep "V"-shaped bow to promote planing. It has a stayed mast, typically made from carbon fibre along with the boom. It has a catboat rig, a raked stem, a vertical transom, a transom-hung rudder controlled by a tiller and a retractable centreboard. It displaces .

Operational history
A review in Go Sail noted of the design, "with her lightweight hull and large rig on a stayed mast she has a high power to weight ratio, but is stable and responsive. There is no trapeze or spinnaker and she can carry a wide range of helm weights".

See also
List of sailing boat types
DC‐14 Phantom - a boat with a similar name
Phantom 14 - a lateen-rigged boat with the same name
Phantom 14 (catamaran) - a boat with a similar name
Phantom 16 (catamaran) - a boat with a similar name

Similar sailboats
Laser (dinghy)
RS Aero

References

External links

Dinghies
1970s sailboat type designs
Sailboat type designs by Paul Wright
Sailboat type designs by Brian Taylor
Sailboat types built by Butler Boats
Sailboat types built by Ovington Boats
Sailboat types built by Vander Craft